The House in the Clouds is a water tower in Thorpeness, Suffolk, England. It was built in 1923 to receive water pumped from Thorpeness Windmill, and was designed to improve the looks of the water tower, disguising its tank with the appearance of a weatherboarded building more in keeping with Thorpeness's mock Tudor and Jacobean style, except seeming to float above the trees. 

The original capacity of the water tank was  but during the Second World War, the House in the Clouds was hit by gunfire from anti-aircraft guns based at Thorpeness. In 1977, the water tower was made redundant by a mains water supply to the village, and additional living space was created. In 1979, the main water tank was removed to fully convert the building into a house. 

It has been a Grade II Listed Building since 1995.

In popular culture
The house was featured in the Suffolk programme during series 3 of the Channel 4 television series Homes by the Sea in 2017. It also featured on series 12 of the BBC television series Flog It! on 8 May 2018.

In its book 100 Buildings in 100 Years, The Twentieth Century Society chose it to represent 1924.

Gallery

References

Water towers in the United Kingdom
Folly buildings in England
Infrastructure completed in 1923
Towers completed in 1923
Buildings and structures in Suffolk
Grade II listed buildings in Suffolk